Hystrichodexia is a genus of parasitic flies in the family Tachinidae.

Species
Hystrichodexia anthracina (Bigot, 1889)
Hystrichodexia armata Röder, 1886
Hystrichodexia brevicornis (Macquart, 1851)
Hystrichodexia echinata Wulp, 1891
Hystrichodexia insolita (Walker, 1853)
Hystrichodexia mellea Giglio-Tos, 1893
Hystrichodexia pueyrredoni Brèthes, 1918

References

Dexiinae
Diptera of South America
Diptera of North America
Tachinidae genera
Taxa named by John Merton Aldrich